Giner is a surname. Notable people with the surname include:

Fernando Giner (born 1964), Spanish footballer
Ferrán Giner Peris (born 1988), Spanish footballer
Francisco Giner de los Ríos (1839–1915), Spanish philosopher and educator
Gloria Giner de los Ríos García (1886–1970), Spanish educator
Isabel Ferrer Giner (1736-1794), Spanish noblewoman and philanthropist
Juan Giner (born 1978), Spanish tennis player
Manuel Giner Miralles (1926–2019), Spanish doctor, entrepreneur and politician
Oka Giner (born 1992), Mexican actress
Práxedes Giner Durán (1893-1978), Mexican politician
Salvador Giner (1934–2019), Spanish sociologist
Silvia Giner (born 1980), Spanish actress
Vicente Giner (c. 1636-1681), Spanish canon and painter
Yevgeni Giner (born 1960), Russian businessman

Surnames of Spanish origin